Tröndelsee is a lake in Kiel, Schleswig-Holstein, Germany. At an elevation of 30 m, its surface area is 24 ha.

Lakes of Schleswig-Holstein
Nature reserves in Schleswig-Holstein